Joseph Henderson (August 2, 1791 – December 25, 1863) was a Jacksonian member of the U.S. House of Representatives from Pennsylvania.

Biography
Joseph Henderson was born in Shippensburg, Pennsylvania.  He moved with his parents to Centre County, Pennsylvania, in 1802.  He attended the public schools and graduated from the Jefferson Medical College at Philadelphia in 1813.  During the War of 1812, he was commissioned first lieutenant in the Twenty-second Regiment, Pennsylvania Volunteers, in the spring of 1813.  He was promoted to captain in the fall of the same year.  He was then brevetted major and given command of a regiment in 1814.  He settled at Browns Mills, Pennsylvania, at the close of the war and engaged in the practice of medicine.

Henderson was elected as a Jacksonian to the Twenty-third and Twenty-fourth Congresses.  He was not a candidate for renomination in 1836.  He moved to Lewistown, Pennsylvania, in 1850 and continued the practice of medicine.  He died in Lewistown in 1863.  Interment in St. Mark’s Cemetery.

Henderson's nephew A. A. Henderson (1816-1875) was a navy surgeon and notable collector of biological specimens.

Sources

The Political Graveyard

People from Pennsylvania in the War of 1812
Physicians from Pennsylvania
1791 births
1863 deaths
Thomas Jefferson University alumni
People from Shippensburg, Pennsylvania
Jacksonian members of the United States House of Representatives from Pennsylvania
19th-century American politicians
Burials in Pennsylvania